Styletoctopus is an extinct genus of octopus. The genus consists of the single species Styletoctopus annae, which lived approximately 95 million years ago. Very few octopus species appear in the fossil record, as octopuses consist of soft tissue that usually decomposes before it has time to fossilize.

See also
2009 extinct fossil octopus discoveries

References

Octopuses
Prehistoric cephalopod genera
Fossil taxa described in 2009